Planter George Branigan (August 21, 1905 – July 8, 1966) was an American baseball pitcher in the Negro leagues. He played with the Cleveland Elites in 1926.

References

External links
 and Seamheads

Cleveland Elites players
1905 births
1966 deaths
Baseball players from Alabama
Baseball pitchers
20th-century African-American sportspeople